Husák is a village and municipality in the Sobrance District in the Košice Region of east Slovakia.

History
In historical records the village was first mentioned in 1567.

Geography
The village lies at an altitude of 220 metres and covers an area of 14.81 km².

It has a population of about 162.

Culture
The village has a public library.

Genealogical resources
The records for genealogical research are available at the state archive "Statny Archiv in Presov, Slovakia"
 Roman Catholic church records (births/marriages/deaths): 1789–1899 (parish B)
 Greek Catholic church records (births/marriages/deaths): 1834–1902 (parish B)

See also
 List of municipalities and towns in Slovakia

References

External links
 
https://web.archive.org/web/20070513023228/http://www.statistics.sk/mosmis/eng/run.html
http://en.e-obce.sk/obec/husak/husak.html
http://www.husak.sk
Surnames of living people in Husak

Villages and municipalities in Sobrance District